International Microbiology is a quarterly peer-reviewed scientific journal published by Springer Science+Business Media and the official journal of the . It covers all aspects of microbiology. The journal was established in 1947 as Microbiología Española and renamed Microbiología SEM in 1985 before obtaining its current title in 1998.

Abstracting and indexing
The journal is abstracted and indexed in Science Citation Index Expanded, Scopus, Biological Abstracts, MEDLINE, and Excerpta Medica. According to the Journal Citation Reports, the journal has a 2020 impact factor of 2.479.

References

External links

English-language journals
Open access journals
Microbiology journals
Publications established in 1998
Quarterly journals